Ernest S. Croot III is a mathematician and professor at the School of Mathematics, Georgia Institute of Technology. He is known for his solution of the Erdős–Graham conjecture, and for contributing to the solution of the cap set problem.

Education 
Ernest Croot attended Centre College at Danville, Kentucky, where he received a B.S. in Mathematics and a B.S. in 
Computer Science in 1994. In 2000, he completed a Ph.D. in Mathematics at the University of Georgia under the supervision of Andrew Granville.

References

External links 
 Croot's personal web page at Georgia Tech
 Mathematics Genealogy Project profile

20th-century American mathematicians
21st-century American mathematicians
Mathematicians from Georgia (U.S. state)
Georgia Tech faculty
1972 births
Living people
University of Georgia alumni
Centre College alumni